Joshua Pusey House is a historic home located in East Fallowfield Township, Chester County, Pennsylvania. The house was built about 1800, and is a two-story, four bay, stuccoed stone dwelling with a gable roof. It has a one-story kitchen wing with a bay window.

It was added to the National Register of Historic Places in 1985.

References

Houses on the National Register of Historic Places in Pennsylvania
Houses completed in 1800
Houses in Chester County, Pennsylvania
National Register of Historic Places in Chester County, Pennsylvania